Kuusisto Castle was a medieval episcopal castle on the island of Kuusisto in Kaarina, Finland, near Turku. The castle was probably built in the early 14th century, although the site seems to have been a bishop's residence by the 1290s.

The castle was ordered to be demolished during the Protestant Reformation in 1528 by the king Gustav I of Sweden. Excavation and reconstruction work on the remaining ruins began in 1891.

References

External links 
 

Castles in Finland
Ruins in Finland
Kaarina
Buildings and structures in Southwest Finland
Houses completed in the 14th century